Eric III of Saxe-Bergedorf (mid 1330s – 1401) was the youngest son of Duke Albert IV of Saxe-Lauenburg and Beata of Schwerin (*?–before 1341*), daughter of Gunzelin VI, Count of Schwerin. Eric was determined for and started a career as cleric. However, after his two elder brothers John III and Albert V had died without heirs, Eric III quit the clergy.

Life
Eric consented, when on 14 April 1359 Albert V, short in money, sold the Herrschaft of Mölln to the city of Lübeck in return for 9737.50 Lübeck marks. The parties agreed upon a repurchase, however, only by the duke or his heirs for themselves, but not as a middleperson for someone else.

In 1370 Eric III succeeded Albert V as Duke of Saxe-Bergedorf-Mölln, a highly indebted branch duchy of Saxe-Lauenburg. So he pawned – in return for 16,262.5 Lübeck marks – all the remaining unencumbered parts of his branch duchy, to wit the Herrschaft of Bergedorf, the Vierlande, his half of the Saxon Wood and Geesthacht, to Lübeck. Eric III only refrained a life tenancy.

Lübeck and Eric III further stipulated, that once he would have died, Lübeck will be entitled to take possession of the pawns until his heirs would repay the credit and simultaneously exercise the repurchase of Mölln, altogether amounting to the then enormous sum of 26,000 Lübeck Marks. In 1386 Otto VI, Count of Tecklenburg-Schwerin gave permission to his cousin Eric III to claim in Otto's name the latter's inheritance of their late aunt Richardis' of Schwerin dower from the Danish King Valdemar Atterdag, protector of her dower since 1373. Eric III died without an heir and was succeeded by his cousin of second degree Eric IV of Saxe-Ratzeburg-Lauenburg. Under Eric IV the two branch duchies merged again into a reunited Saxe-Lauenburg.

Ancestry

Notes

|-

1401 deaths
Eric 03
Eric 03
Year of birth unknown